Rosco McQueen: Firefighter Extreme (simply titled Rosco McQueen in Europe) is an action-genre video game for the PlayStation console.

Rosco McQueen, a firefighter, is the protagonist of the game and he is visible from a 3rd-person perspective. McQueen must stop the game's villain Sylvester T. Square and his robotic minions. The overall objective of the game is to put out all fires before the building burns down.

In the game, Rosco McQueen goes through 15 towering infernos, fighting fires along the way. During normal gameplay, McQueen puts out the fires with a hose attached to a carry-on waterpack and refills are gained by collecting water bottles. An axe is used to destroy robots, Deactivate Power Boxes, Activate switches and break down doors which hinder the path to the goal. The player must also watch out for the temperature: if it gets too hot, then the game ends.

Stephen McFarlane was the lead games designer for the project and also contributing to Banjo-Kazooie: Nuts & Bolts later in his career.

Reception 

The game received mixed reviews according to the review aggregation website GameRankings. Josh Smith of GameSpot wrote in an early review that it "warrants a rental at best." GamePro said of the game: "Conceptually cool, Rosco McQueen ultimately goes up in smoke." Game Informer gave it a negative review nearly two months before the game was released Stateside. In Japan, where the game was ported and published by SCEI under the name  on 30 July 1998, Famitsu gave it a score of 27 out of 40.

Notes

References

External links 
 

1997 video games
Action video games
PlayStation (console) games
PlayStation Network games
Psygnosis games
Sony Interactive Entertainment games
Video games about firefighting
Video games developed in the United Kingdom